Mu Zeng (September 19, 1587 – September 9, 1646), also known as A-chai A-ssu in Nakhi, was the native chieftain of Lijiang between 1597 and 1623. He was born to Mu Qing and Ashijia and ascended the throne when he was ten years old. The chieftain was known for his literature and wrote many anthologies.

In 1624, he announced his privacy and gave his position to his son, Mu Yi.

Mu Zeng welcomed Xu Xiake when he came to Lijiang in 1640.

References 

|-style="text-align: center; background: #FFE4E1;"
|align="center" colspan="3"|Mu Zeng

Politicians from Yunnan
1587 births
1646 deaths
Ming dynasty politicians
People from Lijiang